Bulelani is a given name. Notable people with the name include:

Bulelani Mabhayi (born 1974), South African serial killer and rapist
Bulelani Mfaco, South African asylum seeker and activist in Ireland
Bulelani Ngcuka (born 1954), South African lawyer
Bulelani Vukwana (1973–2002), South African spree killer